This is a list of submissions to the 69th Academy Awards for Best Foreign Language Film. The Academy Award for Best Foreign Language Film was created in 1956 by the Academy of Motion Picture Arts and Sciences to honour non-English-speaking films produced outside the United States. The award is handed out annually, and is accepted by the winning film's director, although it is considered an award for the submitting country as a whole. Countries are invited by the Academy to submit their best films for competition according to strict rules, with only one film being accepted from each country.

For the 69th Academy Awards, thirty-nine films were submitted in the category Academy Award for Best Foreign Language Film. The submission deadline was set on November 1, 1996. Albania and the former Soviet republic of Georgia submitted films for the first time, as did Australia which submitted the multilingual Floating Life in Cantonese, English and German. The highlighted titles were the five nominated films, which came from the Czech Republic, France, Georgia, Norway and Russia. Czech Republic won the Oscar for its drama Kolya.

Submissions

Notes

  Finland's submission, Drifting Clouds, was withdrawn by the director before official screenings began, therefore, it did not compete.

References

69